Vilmos Nagy de Nagybaczon (30 May 1884 – 21 June 1976) was a commanding general of the Royal Hungarian Army (1920–1945), Minister of Defence, a military theorist and historian.

Career highlights
 Commissioned lieutenant in 1905 after graduating from the Budapest Ludovica Military Academy.
 Graduated in 1912 from the Imperial War College (German: Kriegsschule in Vienna, Austria (1909–1912).
 Promoted to major in 1914 and assigned to the Austrian Imperial General Staff.
 During World War I, served with various military units and at the Ministry of War of Austro-Hungary.
 Served on the General Staff of the Hungarian Soviet Republic with the rank of major.
 After the collapse of the Republic in August 1919, reinstated as major and assigned to the reorganized Royal Hungarian Army General Staff.
 Between 1927 and 1931, served as the Colonel in chief of the 1st mounted infantry brigade.
 Between 1931 and 1933 served as the adjutant to the Commander in Chief of the Royal Hungarian Army.
 Promoted to brigadier general in 1934.
 Between 1935 and 1936 served as the Quartermaster General at the Ministry of Defense.
 Promoted to major general in 1937.
 Between 1938 and 1939 served as the commanding officer of the 1st Army Corps.
 Between 1939 and 1940 served as the Inspector General of the Infantry.
 Between 1940 and 1941, unexpectedly placed in retirement, then recalled and appointed as the commanding officer of the 1st Hungarian Army.
 From 24 September 1942 to 12 June 1943 served as the Minister of Defense in the government of Miklós Kállay.
 Arrested and imprisoned upon the accession of the Szálasi government.
 Named in 1965 as a Righteous among the Nations by the Yad Vashem Institute, being the first among Hungarians to be so honoured.

Early life and education
Vilmos Nagy was born into a family of country nobility of Székely ancestry. His ancestors received their patent of nobility in 1676 from Apafi Mihály I, a ruling prince of Transylvania, and the title of Nagybaczoni (Transl: of Nagybaczon) refers to his ancestral home in Covasna County, Transylvania.

He lost his father, Nagy Zsigmond (Sigmund Nagy), a mining engineer of little means at an early age, and his widowed mother could not provide for the children's education. Thus, with no other options, together with his brother Béla he decided to pursue a military career.

In 1902, he graduated with honours from the Kun Kollégium high school in Szászváros, and his exemplary record gained him tuition free admittance, with continuing financial support, to the prestigious Ludovica Military Academy.

Military career
After his graduation in 1905, he elected to serve with the Royal Hungarian Army rather than joining the Imperial Austro-Hungarian Army. This was considered to be a career limiting choice, since there were fewer possibilities for advancement.

His outstanding service surpassed that of his fellow officers and four years after receiving his first commission, he completed the Imperial War College in Vienna (1909–1912). Thus, in his thirtieth year, he was appointed to the Imperial General Staff with the rank of major.

World War I and its aftermath
As a young Staff officer in World War I, he participated in operations against Serbia, in the battles of the Carpathian front, the breakthrough at Gorlice, and operations in Volhynia.

In 1919, after the end of the war and collapse of the Austro-Hungarian Empire,
his extensive military experience and expertise was utilized by the Hungarian Red Army of the Hungarian Soviet Republic and he was again assigned to the General Staff with the rank of major.

Between World Wars
The career of Major Vilmos Nagy continued its uninterrupted rise following the collapse of the short lived Socialist Republic, as he was reassigned to the general staff of the newly formed Royal Hungarian Army.

Between 1927 and 1931, he served as the commanding officer of the 1st Mounted Infantry. This was followed by his appointment as chief adjutant to the Commander in Chief of the military forces. On 1 May 1934, he was promoted to Colonel, and assigned command of the Quartermaster Corps. Then, on 1 May 1937 he was promoted to Brigadier General, and in the following year, was assigned the command of the 1st Mounted Infantry Corps.

Following the First Vienna Award concerning Slovakia, he commanded the forces occupying the city of Košice (Hungarian: Kassa). Within a short while and on a temporary basis, he was assigned to be the Inspector General of the Infantry. Within a year, in March 1940, he was appointed as the commanding officer of the 1st Hungarian Army, and two months later, he was promoted to the rank of Major General.

Following the Second Vienna Award, in September 1940, he led the 1st Hungarian Army into the city of Marosvásárhely (Târgu Mureş). His responsibilities included strengthening the borders of the re-conquered territory, and overseeing the distribution of food supplies to the population at large.

In a completely unexpected move on 31 March 1941, the High Command retired him with the rank of Lieutenant General, and at this point it seemed that the military career of Vilmos Nagy of Nagybaczon has ended.

World War II
On 21 September 1942 the Regent, Miklós Horthy, offered General Nagy the portfolio of the Minister of Defense. In this position, and true to his convictions, Nagy did everything to keep the military out of politics, and struggled to modernize and preserve the remaining Hungarian military stationed at home to prevent the repeat of another debacle which followed the collapse of the Austro-Hungarian Empire in 1918.

Prior to his appointment, the government committed the 2nd Hungarian Army to the Eastern Front, where they eventually met a tragic end by their complete annihilation at Voronezh. While Nagy couldn't bring back the troops from the front, he made every effort to preserve and safeguard the troops back home and ameliorate the conditions of the forced labour battalions. He issued numerous orders for the improvement of their conditions.

These actions met with opposition from the officers' corps at the ministry and politicians of the extreme right. His political effectiveness diminished as he sought to curb the military's culture of Antisemitism and the inhumane treatment of the forced labourers. He strenuously objected to the German request of sending  Jewish forced labourers to the copper mines at Bor, Serbia, and in February 1943, he opposed acquiescing to the German request of sending Hungarian troops to the Balkans.

Due to his position on these issues, he was viewed as increasingly dangerous by his enemies. He was ridiculed, accused of being a 'Jewish lackey' (Zsidóbérenc), of being anti-Axis, and was under constant attack by the extreme political right. Seeing that neither Regent Horthy, nor the Prime Minister Kállay were able or willing to defend him, on 8 June 1943, he submitted his resignation.

He was succeeded by Colonel-In-Chief Lajos Csatay, and the daily press praised the person of the departing minister. On 16 June, the social democratic daily Népszava (Voice of the People) published an exceptionally warm appraisal. Endre Bajcsy-Zsilinszky, in his memoirs on government related matters, he wrote that in his 10 June submission to the Regent, he praised the service of the departing minister. The city of Marosvásárhely named him an honorary citizen but, due to 19 March 1944 occupation of Hungary by the Germans, the ceremony was cancelled.

The war's end
From behind the scenes, Vilmos Nagy continued to support the efforts of those who wished to achieve a separate peace with the Allies. Hungary lay in the direct path of the Nazi armies retreating from the onslaught of the Red Army and, based on past experience, he foresaw the utter destruction to be visited upon the land and the people as the fighting moved ever closer to the borders of Hungary.

The extreme right was not satisfied with distancing him from a position of power and authority, and after the government's takeover by the fascist Arrow Cross, on 16 November 1944, the gendarmerie (csendőrök) arrested him at his Piliscsaba home. After being held for two days at Hotel Lomnic on Svábhegy, which served as a prison facility of the Arrow Cross, together with his brother Béla and other prisoners, he was transferred to the prison in Sopronköhida.

As the Red Army approached, the prisoners, under the command of lieutenant colonel Árpád Barcsay of the gendarmes, were transported to Passau Bavaria, then to Pfarrkirchen, and finally force marched to Gschaid. The Ministry of Defense discovered the constantly moving prisoners in Simbach, and their intervention forced the prisoners' transport to the ministry compound in Tann where they were released. From Tann, on Sunday 28 April 1945, together with his brother, he moved to  where he found accommodations on a Bavarian farm until the US forces reached them on 1 May.

Later life
He managed to return to Hungary in 1946, and in the initial period of the governing coalition of the various political factions, he participated as a committee member for the assessment of military pensions.

After the Communist takeover of 1948, together with many of his peers, he was unjustly attacked, his apartment confiscated, and his pension revoked. He found employment as a gardener and caretaker at the tree nursery of Pilisi Parkerdő gazdaság (hu), where he tended to the planting and care of seedlings and, later, he found employment as a metalsmith.

At the beginning of 1950s a singularly unexpected event transpired. He received an invitation to the fiftieth graduation reunion of his high school. The invitation came from his former classmate and fellow graduate, Dr. Petru Groza, who at the time was the President of Romania. Nagy replied that he could not participate due to his lack of funds and a passport. The President then used his influence with the Hungarian government, and the Secretary of the Hungarian Communist Party, Mátyás Rákosi, was obliged to provide the means to attend the reunion. Further intervention by the President saw the general's pension reinstated.

He gained a measure of comfort and fulfillment when he was selected in 1965 as the first Hungarian Righteous Among the Nations by the Yad Vashem Institute of Jerusalem. The aging general remained mentally active until his death by spending his time writing, editing, and reading. In 1964, he re-edited his work, Végzetes esztendök ("Fateful Years"), which was originally published in 1947. The long-lived soldier died in Piliscsaba on 21 June 1976, shortly after his ninety-second birthday.

Works
In addition to his military expertise, Vilmos Nagy of Nagybaczon was also a military theorist and a historian.

His contributions based on his personal and extensive battlefield and General Staff experience, have provided valuable knowledge about the times. His works include:

 The Campaign Against Romania (A Románia elleni hadjárat), Budapest, 1923.
 The Attack (A támadás), Budapest, 1926.
 Conquest of Serbia (Szerbia meghódítása), Budapest, 1929
 The Fateful Years 1938–1945. (Végzetes esztendök 1938–1945), memoirs (emlékirat) Budapest, 1947).

In memoriam
 In retirement, Vilmos Nagy lived under very modest circumstances and recognition was denied until the 1990s, when changes in the political landscape made this possible.
 As part of Hungary's millennium celebrations on 9 September 2000, his hometown organized The first World Meet of Piliscsaba, during which he was posthumously honoured as an 'Honorary citizen of Piliscsaba', an act that pleased his old neighbours and fellow townsmen. The honour was accepted by his grandchildren, Mrs. András Fáy and Mrs. Károly Nagy.
 On 18 June 2003, with the active promotion of the Federation of Jewish Communities in Hungary, in hand with the Hungarian Federation of Forced Laborers, and the National Memorial and Reconciliation Commission of Hungary, dedicated a memorial plaque in honour of the former Minister of Defense.
 On the 120th anniversary of his birth in 2004, Nagybaczon in Transylvania also dedicated a memorial plaque in his honour.
 On 9 September 2006, with a military guard of honour present, his burial place was declared a part of the National Cemetery of Hungary.

Publications

 József Károlyfalvi: The Presbyiterian General: The Military and Political career of Vilmos Nagy of Nagybaczon (A református tábornok: Nagybaczoni-Nagy Vilmos katonai-politikai pályája)
 Sándor Szakály: The Hungarian Military Elite 1938–1945. Osiris Publishers (A magyar katonai elit)

References

1884 births
1976 deaths
People from Harghita County
Székely people
Defence ministers of Hungary
Hungarian generals
Austro-Hungarian Army officers
Austro-Hungarian military personnel of World War I
Hungarian military personnel of World War II
Military historians
Hungarian Righteous Among the Nations
Protestant Righteous Among the Nations